The Africa Movie Academy Award for Best Nigerian Film is an annual merit by the Africa Film Academy to recognize the best Nollywood film for the year. It was introduced in the 2007 edition as "Best Nigerian Film" but was renamed as "Heart of Africa" award in the 4th to 6th editions. Since the 7th edition, it has been renamed again to "Best Nigerian Film".

References

Lists of award winners
Africa Movie Academy Awards
Awards for best film